Nathaniel Foster (1781 – December 27, 1853) was a noted 18th- and 19th-century American potter and merchant.

Life and career 
Foster was born in Massachusetts in 1781. He moved north to coastal North Yarmouth, Maine (now Yarmouth), where he established a pottery business on Gooches' Lane (today's East Elm Street).

In 1804, he married Rebecca Swasey, with whom he had twelve known children, including daughters Diantha Heald (in 1809) and Mary (1807). Mary died in 1823, aged fifteen or sixteen; Diantha died in 1852, aged 42 or 43. She married John Corliss, another potter, in 1831.

The family lived at 14 Baptist Street (today's Church Street). Foster helped lay out the adjacent Baker Street around 1848.

Death
Foster died on December 27, 1853, aged 71 or 72. He is interred in Yarmouth's Old Baptist Cemetery, alongside his wife, who survived him by 22 years. She died in 1875, aged 90.

Foster's sons, Benjamin and William, who were his assistants, ran the pottery after their father's death. The building housing his pottery was torn down in 1891. 

Joel Brooks later succeeded Foster as Yarmouth's potter. He lived on Gooches' Lane, near Foster's pottery.

References 

American potters
American merchants
Artists from Maine
1781 births
1853 deaths
People from Massachusetts
People from North Yarmouth, Maine
People from Yarmouth, Maine